The Lomond River is a river in the Fort William First Nation and the Municipality of Neebing in Thunder Bay District in Northwestern Ontario, Canada. The river is part of the Great Lakes Basin, and flows from Loch Lomond through a small intermediate lake to Lake Superior.

References

Sources

Rivers of Thunder Bay District
Tributaries of Lake Superior